The N4 road is the Trans-Gambia Highway extension in Senegal, which is the main connection between the Casamance area in the south and the capital Dakar.

The road runs north from Ziguinchor in Casamance to Bignona, crossing the Casamance River. It  runs north-east to Bounkiling and then north to traverse the country of Gambia between Soma and Farafenni, crossing the Gambia River across the newly opened Senegambia Bridge. After travelling north-west to Kaolack it joins the N1 road, which links to Dakar.

The building of a prestressed concrete bridge over the Gambia River was finally completed in January 2019 and will be opened to all vehicle traffic by July 2019

An alternative (smaller) route is the N5 via Bignona and Banjul, crossing the Gambia river by ferry at Banjul and rejoining the N4 just south of Kaolack.

See also
 N1 road
 N2 road
 N3 road
 N5 road
 N6 road
 N7 road
 Transport in Senegal

References

Road transport in Senegal